The 2018 Colorado State Senate elections took place as part of the biennial United States elections. Colorado voters elected state senators in 17 of the 35 districts in the state senate. State senators serve four-year terms in the Colorado State Senate. The Colorado Reapportionment Commission provides a statewide map of the state Senate here, and individual district maps are available from the U.S. Census here.

A primary election on June 26, 2018 determined which candidates appeared on the November 6 general election ballot. Primary election results can be obtained from the Colorado Secretary of State's website.

Following the 2016 state Senate elections, Republicans maintained effective control of the Senate with 18 members. Democratic state Senator Cheri Jahn switched from Democrat to unaffiliated on December 29, 2017. However, Sen. Jahn decided to still caucus with Democrats. In the 2018 election, Republicans defended 10 seats while Democrats defended 6 seats with Jahn's 1 Independent seat up for grabs.

To claim control of the chamber from Republicans, the Democrats needed to net 1 Senate seat while electing a Democrat to the Independent seat. The Democratic candidate won the Independent seat while Democrats netted 2 additional seats, giving the party majority status in the chamber.

Summary of Results
Districts not shown are not up for election until 2020.

Source:

Incumbents not seeking re-election

Term-limited incumbents
Seven incumbent Senators (three Democrats, three Republicans and one Independent) are term-limited and unable to seek a third term.

Kevin Grantham (R), District 2
Kent Lambert (R), District 9
Kevin Lundberg (R), District 15
Cheri Jahn (I), District 20
Andy Kerr (D), District 22
Irene Aguilar (D) District 32
Lucia Guzman (D), District 34

Retiring incumbents
One incumbent Democrat is not seeking re-election despite being able to do so.
Michael Merrifield (D), District 11

Closest races 
Seats where the margin of victory was under 10%:

Detailed Results

Sources:

District 1

District 2

District 3

District 5

District 6

District 7

District 9

District 11

District 13

District 15

District 16

District 20

District 22

District 24

District 30

District 32

District 34

See also
 United States elections, 2018
 United States House of Representatives elections in Colorado, 2018
 Colorado elections, 2018
 Colorado gubernatorial election, 2018
 Colorado Attorney General election, 2018
 Colorado Secretary of State election, 2018
 Colorado State Treasurer election, 2018
 Colorado State Board of Education election, 2018
 Regents of the University of Colorado election, 2018
 Colorado House of Representatives election, 2018
 Elections in Colorado

References

State Senate
2018
Colorado State Senate